Klaus Bresser (born 22 July 1936) is a German journalist and television presenter.

Life 
Bresser was born in Berlin and studied at the university of Cologne. He works as a journalist for German broadcasters (since 1965 for Westdeutscher Rundfunk and since 1977 for ZDF).

Awards 
Theodor Wolff Prize (1963)
Goldene Kamera (1986)
 (1989)
Order of Merit of Rhineland-Palatinate (2000)

Books by Bresser

Caricatures of the year 
Die Karikaturen des Jahres 1990/91. Verlag Walter Podszun, Brilon 1991, .
Die Karikaturen des Jahres 1991/92. Verlag Walter Podszun, Brilon 1992, .
Die Karikaturen des Jahres 1992/93. Verlag Walter Podszun, Brilon 1993, .
Die Karikaturen des Jahres 1993/94. Verlag Walter Podszun, Brilon 1994, .
Die Karikaturen des Jahres 1996. Verlag Walter Podszun, Brilon 1997, 
Die Karikaturen des Jahres 1997. Verlag Walter Podszun, Brilon 1998, 
Die Karikaturen des Jahres 1998. Verlag Walter Podszun, Brilon 1999, .

External links 

 

German male journalists
Journalists from Berlin
20th-century German journalists
21st-century German journalists
German television presenters
German television journalists
German broadcast news analysts
1936 births
Living people
ZDF people
Westdeutscher Rundfunk people